Albatrellus tianschanicus is a species of fungus in the family Albatrellaceae. It was originally described as Scutiger tianschanicus by Appollinaris Semenovich Bondartsev  in 1960, and later transferred to the genus Albatrellus by Zdeněk Pouzar in 1960. Albatrellus henanensis, described in 1991, is a synonym.

See also
Fuller comparative discussion at Albatrellus subrubescens

References

External links

Russulales
Fungi described in 1960
Fungi of Asia